The David Traylor Zoo is a small zoo located in Emporia, Kansas, United States. Admission to the zoo is free. You can walk through the zoo to view the naturalized exhibits. The zoo is located in Soden's Grove Park, which includes a small train that operates in the summer, the historical Marsh Arch Bridge, and an All Veterans Memorial.

Overview
The David Traylor Zoo is one of the smallest zoos in the United States that is accredited by the Association of Zoos and Aquariums (AZA). It features naturalized exhibits of native and exotic birds and animals, and is noted for its extensive landscaping.

The Emporia Friends of the Zoo was founded in 1978, and provides financial support for expansion, development, and maintenance at the zoo. Funding for the Friends is primarily through membership and contributions.

Animals at the zoo include ducks, prairie dog, Cinereous vultures, bison, mule deer, red foxes, cougar, and cotton-top tamarin.

During the year, the zoo has various events including an annual Open House (the fourth Sunday in June), Boo in the Zoo at Halloween and Zoo Lights during the winter holiday season.

References

External links
 

Buildings and structures in Lyon County, Kansas
Emporia, Kansas
Zoos in Kansas
Tourist attractions in Lyon County, Kansas